George Tintor (6 May 1957 – 30 May 2021) was a Canadian rower. He competed in the men's eight event at the 1976 Summer Olympics. Tintor was of Serbian descent.

Tintor died on 30 May 2021 in Mississauga. His funeral service took place at the All Serbian Saints Serbian Orthodox Church in Mississauga, and he was interred at a later date in Zürich.

References

External links
 

1957 births
2021 deaths
Rowers from Toronto
Canadian male rowers
Canadian people of Serbian descent
Olympic rowers of Canada
Rowers at the 1976 Summer Olympics
Burials in the canton of Zürich